Zviad (Georgian: ზვიად) is a Georgian masculine given name. Notable people with the name include:

Zviad Endeladze (born 1966), Georgian footballer
Zviad Gamsakhurdia (1939–1993), dissident, scientist, writer; the first elected post-Soviet President of the Republic of Georgia
Zviad Izoria (born 1984), chess grandmaster
Zviad Jeladze (born 1973), Georgian footballer
Zviad Kvachantiradze (born 1965), Georgian diplomat
Zviad Sturua (born 1978), Georgian association footballer

Georgian masculine given names

es:Zviad